Surcasti is a town in Switzerland.

Villages in Switzerland
Former municipalities of Graubünden
Lumnezia